Walter V. Schaefer (December 10, 1904 – June 15, 1986) was an American jurist and educator.

Born in Grand Rapids, Michigan, Schaefer graduated from Hyde Park High School and then received his bachelor's and law degrees from University of Chicago. Schaefer practiced law in Chicago, Illinois and Washington, D. C. Schaefer also was a law professor at Northwestern University and served as a legislative aide to Illinois Governor Adlai Stevenson. Schaeffer then served on the Illinois Supreme Court from 1951 until his retirement in 1976. Schaefer died in a hospital in Lake Forest, Illinois.

Notes

1904 births
1986 deaths
Politicians from Chicago
Politicians from Grand Rapids, Michigan
Illinois lawyers
Lawyers from Washington, D.C.
University of Chicago alumni
University of Chicago Law School alumni
Northwestern University faculty
Justices of the Illinois Supreme Court
20th-century American judges
20th-century American lawyers